This is a list of universities in Bulgaria. As of February 15, 2023, there are 52 accredited higher education institutions in the country - universities, academies, colleges, etc.

Universities
 Academy of the Ministry of Interior - Sofia
 Agricultural University of Plovdiv
 American University in Bulgaria
 Bulgarian Virtual University
 Burgas Free University
 D. A. Tsenov Academy of Economics
 European Polytechnical University
 Georgi Rakovski Military Academy
 Higher School of Insurance and Finance
 National Academy for Theatre and Film Arts
 Lyuben Karavelov Civil Engineering University
 Medical University Pleven
 Medical University - Plovdiv
 Medical University of Varna
 National Academy of Arts
 National Military University
 National Sports Academy
 New Bulgarian University
 "Nikola Vaptsarov" Naval Academy
 Pancho Vladigerov National Academy of Music
 Plovdiv University
 Ruse University
 Specialized Higher School of Librarian Knowledge and Information Technology - Sofia
 Sofia Medical University
 Sofia University
 South-West University "Neofit Rilski"
 Technical University of Gabrovo
 Technical University of Sofia
 Technical University of Sofia - Branch Plovdiv
 Technical University of Varna
 Todor Kableshkov Higher School of Transport 
 Trakia University - Stara Zagora
 University of Architecture, Civil Engineering and Geodesy
 University of Chemical Technology and Metallurgy
 University of Economics Varna
 University of Food Technology
 University of Forestry
 University of Mining and Geology
 University of National and World Economy
 University of Shumen "Episkop Konstantin Preslavski"
 University "Prof. Asen Zlatarov" - Burgas
 Varna Free University
 Varna University of Management
 Vasil Levski National Military University
 Veliko Tarnovo University

See also
 Education in Bulgaria
 List of schools in Bulgaria

References

Universities
Bulgaria
Bulgaria